William Gustavo Álvarez Vargas  (born 15 September 1995) is a Bolivian professional footballer who plays in Bolivian Primera División for Guabirá.

He made his debut for the full Bolivian side on the 27 March 2021, against Chile.

References

External links
 

Living people
1995 births
Bolivian footballers
Bolivia international footballers
Association football forwards
Club Real Potosí players
Guabirá players
Club Aurora players
C.D. Jorge Wilstermann players
Bolivian Primera División players
People from Potosí